David William Logan Johnstone (born 6 May 1951) is a British rock guitarist and vocalist, best known for his long-time collaboration with Elton John as a member of the Elton John Band.

Career 
Johnstone's first work was with Noel Murphy in 1968, where he received his first album credit on the album Another Round. By 1969, Johnstone had secured regular work as a session musician, where he began to branch out and explore differing genres of music, and experiment with a variety of instruments. In 1970, when Lyell Tranter (one of the two guitarists in the acoustic British folk group Magna Carta) left the band, Johnstone took his place as a member. He recorded several albums with them beginning in 1970 on Seasons (1970), and continued to contribute to Songs from Wasties Orchard (1971) (named after the street where he lived in Long Hanborough, Oxfordshire), and a live album entitled In Concert.

During his stint with Magna Carta, Johnstone played a wide variety of instruments including guitar, mandolin, sitar, and dulcimer. He also caught producer Gus Dudgeon's attention during this time – Dudgeon asking Johnstone to play on Bernie Taupin's eponymous 1971 solo album, which resulted in a meeting with Elton John, and ultimately, Johnstone's playing on John's 1971 album Madman Across the Water, after which he was invited to join Elton John's band as a full member. Previously, the Elton John Band consisted of John himself, bassist Dee Murray, and drummer Nigel Olsson.

Johnstone's debut album with Elton John as a full-time member of his band was Honky Chateau, on which he played electric and acoustic guitars, slide guitar, banjo, and mandolin, and also sang backing vocals alongside Murray and Olsson.

In 1972 he worked with Joan Armatrading and Pam Nestor on their Gus Dudgeon-produced debut album Whatever's for Us, playing acoustic and electric guitar on several tracks, and sitar on the song "Visionary Mountains".

Johnstone released a solo album, Smiling Face, in 1973 through The Rocket Record Company and created a short-lived band called China that released an eponymous album in 1977.

Even while playing alongside other artists such as Stevie Nicks, Meat Loaf and Alice Cooper during the late 1970s and early 1980s, Johnstone was never very far from Elton's projects, and following his reunion with original bandmates Nigel Olsson and Dee Murray full-time for 1982's "Jump Up" tour, has rarely been absent from an Elton John album track or tour.

In 1990, Johnstone collaborated for the first time with lyricist Steve Trudell. With music and lyric in place, the two formed Warpipes, which included past and present Elton John band members Nigel Olsson on drums, Bob Birch on bass, Guy Babylon on keyboards, along with Billy Trudel as vocalist. In 1991, Warpipes released their only album, Holes in the Heavens, on the label Artful Balance Records. When Artful Balance Records folded, this album was re-released on Bridge Recordings. The album title was changed to simply "Warpipes" and the song line-up was altered slightly.

In 1991, Johnstone produced Addison Steel's Stormy Blue in which he played guitar, mandolin, sitar, and banjo, and performed vocals. Co-producer Guy Babylon joined with keyboard arrangements, alongside drummer Nigel Olsson and Billy Trudell adding percussion and vocals respectively.

In 1996, Johnstone released an instructional guitar video titled Davey Johnstone: Star Licks Master Sessions for Star Licks Productions, in which he plays a wide variety of John classics, joined by Billy Trudel on vocals and Bob Birch on bass.

In 1997, while on tour with John, Johnstone and then Elton John bandmate and former Hellecasters guitarist John Jorgenson spent much of their off time creating Crop Circles, an album of acoustic instrumentation released in 1998.

On 10 June 2009, Johnstone played a landmark 2000th show as a member of the Elton John Band at the SECC in Glasgow, Scotland. He is currently serving as John's musical director, in addition to his guitar work, playing along with Nigel Olsson and John Mahon; he also performed with Bob Birch before Birch's death in August 2012.

In 2014, he played on "Belle Fleur" and "If You Were My Love" from Stevie Nicks' album 24 Karat Gold: Songs from the Vault. He knew Nicks from when he played guitar on several songs from her 1981 album Bella Donna.

On 1 October 2019, Johnstone performed his 3000th show with Elton John at the first of two Farewell Yellow Brick Road tour stops at the SaskTel Centre in Saskatoon, Saskatchewan.

Personal life 
Johnstone lives in Los Angeles with his wife. He has seven children.

Solo discography 
 Smiling Face (1973)
 "Love Is a Crazy Feeling" (single – B-side "Burnin'") (1980)
 Deeper Than My Roots (2022)

Collaborations 

With Elton John
 Madman Across the Water (Uni Records, 1971)
 Honky Château (Uni Records, 1972)
 Don't Shoot Me I'm Only the Piano Player (MCA Records, 1973)
 Goodbye Yellow Brick Road (MCA Records, 1973)
 Caribou (MCA Records, 1974)
 Captain Fantastic and the Brown Dirt Cowboy (MCA Records, 1975)
 Rock of the Westies (MCA Records, 1975)
 Blue Moves (Rocket, 1976)
 Too Low for Zero (Geffen, 1983)
 Breaking Hearts (Geffen, 1984)
 Ice on Fire (Geffen, 1985)
 Leather Jackets (Geffen, 1986)
 Reg Strikes Back (MCA Records, 1988)
 Sleeping with the Past (MCA Records, 1989)
 The One (MCA Records, 1992)
 Made in England (Island Records, 1995)
 The Big Picture (Mercury Records, 1997)
 Songs from the West Coast (Mercury Records, 2001)
 Peachtree Road (Universal Music Records, 2004)
 The Captain & the Kid (Mercury Records, 2006)
 Wonderful Crazy Night (Mercury Records, 2016)

With Alice Cooper
 From the Inside (1978)
 Flush the Fashion (1980)

With Joan Armatrading
 Whatever's for Us (A&M Records, 1972)

With Eric Carmen
 Tonight You're Mine (Arista Records, 1980)

With Belinda Carlisle
 A Woman and a Man (Chrysalis Records, 1996)

With B.B. King
 B.B. King & Friends: 80 (Geffen, 2005)

With Shaun Cassidy
 Under Wraps (Warner Bros. Records, 1978)

With Ryan Malcolm
 Home (Sony, 2003)

With Jimmy Webb
 Land's End (Asylum Records, 1974)

With Rick Astley
 Portrait (RCA Records, 2005)

With Kiki Dee
 Loving & Free (Rocket, 1973)
 Kiki Dee (Rocket, 1977)
 Stay With Me (Rocket, 1978)

With Brian Cadd
 Yesterdaydreams (Capitol Records, 1978)

With Olivia Newton-John
 The Rumour (MCA Records, 1988)

With Bernie Taupin
 Taupin (DJM, 1971)

With Rod Stewart
 A Spanner in the Works (Warner Bros. Records, 1995)

With Yvonne Elliman
 Night Flight (RSO Records, 1978)
 Yvonne (RSO Records, 1979)

With Vonda Shepard
 Vonda Shepard (Reprise Records, 1989)

With Leo Sayer
 Leo Sayer (Chrysalis Records, 1978)

With Stevie Nicks
 Bella Donna (ATCO Records, 1981)
 24 Karat Gold: Songs from the Vault (Reprise Records, 2014)

References

External links 

Magna Carta official website
Davey Johnstone's 2,000th Show

1951 births
Living people
20th-century Scottish male singers
Scottish rock singers
Scottish pop singers
Alice Cooper (band) members
Neverland Express members
Scottish multi-instrumentalists
Lead guitarists
Sitar players
Scottish banjoists
Scottish rock guitarists
Scottish male guitarists
Musicians from Edinburgh
Scottish expatriates in the United States
Slide guitarists
Rocket Records artists
British mandolinists
Scottish songwriters
Scottish session musicians
People educated at Forrester High School
Elton John Band members